Special adviser may refer to:

Special adviser (Norway), a high-ranking civil servant
Special adviser (UK), a political appointee who assists a government minister
Special Adviser, title of some Under-Secretaries-General of the United Nations

See also
Senior advisor